Earlswood railway station serves Earlswood, south of Redhill, in Surrey, England. It is on the Brighton Main Line,  down the line from  via  and south of the junction between the Redhill line and the Quarry line. Train services are provided by Thameslink , Great Western and Southern.

History
Earlswood station was opened by the London Brighton and South Coast Railway on 1 August 1868. The station was rebuilt with four platforms in 1906 at the time of the quadrupling of the main line. The platforms on the fast lines were closed in the 1980s.

On 11 January 2016, payment using Oyster and contactless payment cards was introduced at the station, as part of the Oyster extension from Merstham to Gatwick Airport. The station is outside the London Fare Zone area, and special fares apply. 

Some Oyster photocards (as well as Freedom Passes) are not valid here: the nearest station that these cards can be used is Coulsdon South, only in the northbound direction.

Services
Off-peak, all services at Earlswood are operated by Thameslink using  EMUs.

The typical off-peak service in trains per hour is:
 2 tph to  via 
 2 tph to Three Bridges 

During the peak hours, the station is served by an additional half-hourly Southern service to London Victoria originating from either Gatwick Airport or Three Bridges.

On Sundays, the station is served by an hourly service between Bedford and Three Bridges, with the stopping pattern altered.

References

External links

Railway stations in Surrey
Former London, Brighton and South Coast Railway stations
Railway stations in Great Britain opened in 1868
Railway stations served by Govia Thameslink Railway